Isophrictis lineatellus is a moth of the family Gelechiidae. It was described by Philipp Christoph Zeller in 1850. It is found in Asia Minor, North Africa and Spain, Portugal, France, Corsica, Sardinia, Sicily, Italy and Greece.

References

Moths described in 1850
Isophrictis